The Camera Museum (Tamil: நிழற்படக் கருவி அருங்காட்சியகம்) is a museum in George Town, Penang, Malaysia.

History
The museum started its operation on 31 August 2013 and was officiated on 9 October 2013 by Penang Chief Minister Lim Guan Eng.

Architecture
The museum is housed in a two-story shop house building with a total floor area of 325 m2, which is divided into Dark Room, Obscura Room and Pinhole Room. It also features a cafe and souvenir shop.

Exhibition
The museum displays up to 1,000 vintage cameras and accessories.

Events
The museum regularly holds exhibition and festival events every month.

See also
 List of museums in Malaysia

References

External links

 

Buildings and structures in George Town, Penang
Historic house museums in Malaysia
Museums established in 2013
Museums in Penang
Photographic technology museums
Tourist attractions in George Town, Penang